Vaamonde is a Spanish surname. Notable people with the surname include:

 José Lino Vaamonde (1900–1986), Spanish architect 
 Lucía Vaamonde (born 1949), Venezuelan hurdler

Spanish-language surnames